Kroge is a village in the town of Walsrode in North Germany. It lies in the Lower Saxony district of Soltau-Fallingbostel.

Geography

Location 
Kroge lies in the northeastern part of the former municipality of Bomlitz, 3 km northeast of Bomlitz itself.

Neighbouring villages 
Its neighbouring villages are - clockwise from the north - Bommelsen, Riepe, Bomlitz, Benefeld, Jarlingen and Ahrsen.

Rivers 
The Bomlitz flows through Kroge and discharges further south into the Böhme.

History 
Since the land reform of 1974 the formerly independent parish of Kroge has become one of the eight villages in Bomlitz parish.

Infrastructure

Transport

Road 
Kroge lies right on the B 440 federal highway that runs from Dorfmark via Visselhövede to  Rotenburg (Wümme). The A 27 motorway passes 12 km away to the southwest, and the A 7 4 km to the southeast.

External links 
 The parish of Bomlitz (including an overview of its villages) 

Heidekreis
Villages in Lower Saxony
Walsrode